Joe Rickson (born Oscar Erickson; September 6, 1880 – January 8, 1958) was an American actor of the silent era. He appeared in 90 films between 1913 and 1945. He was born in Clearcreek, Montana and died in Los Angeles, California.

Partial filmography

 The Price of Crime (1914)
 The Night Riders (1916, Short) - The Apache Kid
 The Wedding Guest (1916, Short) - Jose Del Barra
 The Three Godfathers (1916) - Rusty Conners
 The Committee on Credentials (1916, Short) - Clem
 For the Love of a Girl (1916, Short) - Cliff Buckley
 Love's Lariat (1916) - Cowboy
 A Woman's Eyes (1916, Short) - Buzzard
 The Devil's Own (1916, Short) - Snake Matthews
 Cavanaugh of the Forest Rangers (1918) - Neil Ballard
 The Home Trail (1918) - Blackie
 Baree, Son of Kazan (1918) - Perriot
 Cactus Crandall (1918) - Mendoza
 Go-Get-Em Garringer (1919)
 The Little Boss (1919) - Pete Farley
 Outlawed (1921) - Tom Benson
 Flower of the North (1921) - Pierre
 The Purple Riders (1922) - Rudolph Myers
 Brass Commandments (1923) - Tularosa
 Pioneer Trails (1923) - The Sheriff
 Rough Ridin' (1924) - Jack Wells
 Code of the Wilderness (1924) - Tom Chavis
 Rip Roarin' Roberts (1924) - 'Hawk' Andrews
 Fast Fightin' (1925) - The Man
 Beyond the Border (1925) - Blackie Cullen - Deputy
 Riders of the Purple Sage (1925) - Henchman Dave Slack (uncredited)
 A Two-Fisted Sheriff (1925) - George Rivers
 Baree, Son of Kazan (1925) - Pierre Eustach
 The Human Tornado (1925) - Tom Crowley
 The Bad Lands (1925) - Charlie Squirrel
 Action Galore (1925) - Gil Kruger
 Rawhide (1926) - Strobel
 With Davy Crockett at the Fall of the Alamo (1926) - Colonel William B. Travis
 The Flying Horseman (1926) - Henchman #2
 The Buckaroo Kid (1926) - McIntyre (uncredited)
 Whispering Sage (1927)
 Two-Gun of the Tumbleweed (1927) - Darrel (uncredited)
 Border Blackbirds (1927) - Suderman
 The Devil's Double (1927) - Carl Blackburn
 Land of the Lawless (1927) - 'Brush' Gallagher
 A Trick of Hearts (1928) - Black Jack
 The Code of the Scarlet (1928) - Pete
 Yellow Contraband (1928) - Pierre Dufresne
 The Drifter (1929) - Hank
 The Lariat Kid (1929) - Tony
 The Lone Star Ranger (1930) - Henchman #2
 Trails of Danger (1930) - U.S. Marshal Bartlett
 Not Exactly Gentlemen (1931) - Henchman (uncredited)
 A Son of the Plains (1931) - Deputy (uncredited)
 Wild Horse (1931) - Deputy Clark
 Heritage of the Desert (1932) - Joe (uncredited)
 Sundown Rider (1932) - Bates (uncredited)
 Fargo Express (1933) - Lynn - Gambler Who Chases Mort
 Elinor Norton (1934) - Ranch Hand (uncredited)
 The Prescott Kid (1934) - Townsman (uncredited)
 Les Misérables (1935) - Gendarme (uncredited)
 Under the Pampas Moon (1935) - Bazan's Gaucho (uncredited)
 Bar 20 Rides Again (1935) - Herb Layton
 Escape from Devil's Island (1935) - Guard (uncredited)
 Gallant Defender (1935) - Soap Creek Smith (uncredited)
 Song of the Saddle (1936) - Second Stagecoach Driver (uncredited)
 Three on the Trail (1936) - Gabby (uncredited)
 Hopalong Cassidy Returns (1936) - Henchman Buck
 Arizona Legion (1939) - Dakota - Henchman (uncredited)
 Stagecoach (1939) - Ike Plummer (uncredited)
 The Oklahoma Kid (1939) - Homesteader (uncredited)
 Prairie Law (1940) - Jake - Henchman (uncredited)
 Triple Justice (1940) - Henchman Luke Grimes (uncredited)
 Girl Rush (1944) - 4-Up Driver (uncredited)
 Flame of Barbary Coast (1945) - Dealer (uncredited)
 West of the Pecos (1945) - Joe - Townsman (uncredited)
 The Sun Shines Bright (1953) - Dink (uncredited)

External links

 

1880 births
1958 deaths
American male film actors
American male silent film actors
20th-century American male actors
Male actors from Montana
Male Western (genre) film actors